Konoe (written: 近衛 or 近衞) is a Japanese surname. It is sometimes spelled "Konoye" based on historical kana usage. Notable people with the surname include:

, the 76th emperor of Japan
, Japanese politician and journalist
, Japanese politician and the 34th, 38th and 39th Prime Minister of Japan
, Japanese kugyō
, Japanese classical composer and conductor
, Japanese kugyō
, Japanese kugyō
, Japanese kugyō
, Japanese kugyō
, Japanese kugyō
, Japanese kugyō
, Japanese kugyō
, Japanese kugyō
, Japanese kugyō
, Japanese actor
, Japanese kugyō
, Japanese kugyō
, Japanese kugyō
, Japanese kugyō
, Japanese kugyō
, Japanese kugyō
, Japanese kugyō
, Japanese kugyō
, Japanese kugyō
, Japanese courtier, poet, calligrapher, painter and diarist
, Japanese kuge
, Japanese kugyō
, Japanese kugyō
, Japanese kugyō
, Japanese kugyō
, president of the International Federation of Red Cross and Red Crescent Societies
, Japanese kugyō
, Japanese kugyō
, Japanese kugyō
, Japanese kugyō
, Japanese princess

See also
Konoe family, a branch of the Fujiwara family

Japanese-language surnames